The Sidemen Show is a British reality stunt web television series starring British YouTube group Sidemen, composed of JJ Olatunji, Harry Lewis, Ethan Payne, Vik Barn, Simon Minter, Josh Bradley, and Tobi Brown. The series is produced by Blue Ant Digital Studios in association with Antenna Pictures, and executive produced by Jago Lee, Dan Lubetkin, Austin Long, and James Tooley, with Craig Pickles serving as the series director and Iain Glen narrating.

The series sees the Sidemen take on stunts and challenges around the world alongside celebrity guests, including Steve-O, Steve Aoki, Jack Whitehall, Kristian Nairn, Jme, Bear Grylls, Nicole Scherzinger, and Sergey Volkov. All seven episodes of the series were released on YouTube Premium on 18 June 2018.

Cast

Main 

 JJ Olatunji
 Harry Lewis
 Ethan Payne
 Vik Barn
 Simon Minter
 Josh Bradley
 Tobi Brown

Guest 

 Steve-O
 Steve Aoki
 Jack Whitehall
 Kristian Nairn
 Jme
 Bear Grylls
 Nicole Scherzinger
 Sergey Volkov

Episodes

Production

Development 
On 3 May 2018, after months of speculation that the British YouTube group Sidemen, composed of JJ Olatunji, Harry Lewis, Ethan Payne, Vik Barn, Simon Minter, Josh Bradley, and Tobi Brown, had been working on a secret project, it was announced that the Sidemen would be starring in their own web television series, titled The Sidemen Show, for release on YouTube Red. The series is produced by Blue Ant Digital Studios in association with Antenna Pictures, and executive produced by Jago Lee, Dan Lubetkin, Austin Long, and James Tooley. Craig Pickles serves as the series director and Chris Lore as series producer, with Iain Glen narrating. Deadline Hollywood said it was "thought to be one of the largest YouTube Red commissions for a British production company since Origin".

After the series was announced, Luke Hyams, Head of YouTube Originals in Europe, Middle East, and Africa, stated, "The Sidemen Show remains true to the humor and inclusive camaraderie that have made the guys so popular, but supercharges each episode with challenges, stunts and special guest stars that set this series of adventures apart from anything their fans have seen them do before."

Filming 
Filming for the series took place in various countries, including the United Kingdom, Morocco, Russia, and Austria.

Music 
James McWilliam serves as the primary composer for the series. McWilliam said that it was decided early on "that each episode would have its own musical identity," adding that, "the tone of the music for each episode was largely decided by [Pickles], the director." The Sidemen also contributed "invaluable" feedback on the score, since they had many years of experience making videos, "and often changed the direction into something they felt was more suitable," said McWilliam.

Release 
The series, consisting of seven 30-minute episodes, was released on 18 June 2018 on the Sidemen YouTube channel exclusively through YouTube Premium, the paid subscription arm of YouTube, which had previously been called YouTube Red, but rebranded that day to YouTube Premium when it launched in 12 new countries including the United Kingdom and Canada. At the time of launch, only the first episode was available to watch for free, but on 8 April 2020, YouTube removed the paywall for the remaining six episodes. It was announced at the time to be temporary while people were under stay-at-home orders due to the COVID-19 pandemic, but it has turned out to be a permanent decision; all episodes remain freely available as of November 2022.

Marketing 
The Sidemen officially confirmed the series with the release of an exclusive teaser trailer on 23 May 2018. The series' official trailer was released on 2 June 2018, following the group's third annual charity football match, which took place that day.

References

External links 
 
 
 

2010s British comedy-drama television series
2010s British reality television series
2018 British television series debuts
2018 British television series endings
2018 web series debuts
2018 web series endings
British action television series
British adventure television series
English-language television shows
YouTube Premium original series
KSI